Nancy Stuart may refer to:

 Nancy M. Stuart, American portrait photographer
 Nancy Rubin Stuart (born 1944), author and journalist